CoRoT-23b is a transiting exoplanet found by the CoRoT space telescope in 2011.

It is a hot Jupiter-sized planet orbiting a G0V star with Te = 5900K, M = 1.14M☉, R = 1.61R☉, and near-solar metallicity. Its age is 6.2 - 8.2 Gyr.

The planet may be in an unstable orbit and subject to merger with the host star in the future.

References

Hot Jupiters
Transiting exoplanets
Exoplanets discovered in 2011
22b